Janua is a genus of polychaetes, containing the following subgenera and species:

Dexiospira Caullery & Mesnil, 1897
Janua ainu Uchida, 1971
Janua bushi (Rioja, 1942)
Janua ceylonica (Pillai, 1960)
Janua corrugata (Montagu, 1803)
Janua glossoeides Harris, 1968
Janua karaitivensis (Pillai, 1960)
Janua marioni (Caullery & Mesnil, 1897)
Janua nipponicus (Okuda, 1934)
Janua oshoroensis Uchida, 1971
Janua pagenstecheri (de Quatrefages, 1865)
Janua preacuta Vine, 1972
Janua pusilloides (Bush, 1905)
Janua quasiacuta Lommerzheim, 1981 †
Janua semidentata (Bush, 1905)
Janua spirillum (Linnaeus, 1758)
Janua tricornigerus (Rioja, 1942)
Janua turrita Vine, 1972
Fauveldora Knight-Jones, 1972
Janua anticorrugata Vine, 1972
Janua kayi Knight-Jones, 1972
Pillaiospira 
Janua natalensis Knight-Jones & Knight-Jones, 1974
Janua trifuscata Knight-Jones, 1973
Incertae sedis
Janua echinata (Wesenberg-Lund, 1953)
Janua formosa (Bush, 1904)
Janua pseudocorrugata (Bush, 1904)
Janua steueri (Sterzinger, 1909)

References

Serpulidae